Halftime Heat was a series of professional wrestling broadcasts produced by WWE used as Super Bowl counterprogramming. They aired during their respective year's halftime of the Super Bowl.

History
Originally produced under the World Wrestling Federation banner (WWF), Halftime Heat aired during a 20-minute block on USA Network during Super Bowl XXXIII in 1999, as a special episode of Sunday Night Heat. The inaugural Halftime Heat featured an Empty arena match between The Rock and Mankind. The match was also accompanied by a Super Bowl ad purchased by the WWF, tying into their Attitude Era branding. During the match, Mankind won his second WWF Championship.

Halftime Heat returned the following year, featuring highlights from The Hardy Boyz taking on The Dudley Boyz as well as the bikini contest, both from that year's Royal Rumble. It concluded with an Interview with Jim Ross and Stone Cold Steve Austin, which discussed an injury update and his engagement to Debra McMichael.

It was announced in January 2019 that it would be brought back as a special event on the WWE Network, YouTube, Facebook and Twitter. During the pre-show of the Royal Rumble footage was shown of what happened after NXT TakeOver: Phoenix went off the air, which led to the announcement of Aleister Black, Ricochet, and Velveteen Dream taking on Adam Cole, Johnny Gargano, and Tommaso Ciampa, during the returning Halftime Heat. Shawn Michaels was also announced as part of the announce team,  and was joined by Vic Joseph. During the match, the team of Black, Ricochet and Dream were victorious. WWE personnel later announced that the match had 3 million viewers, making it the most watched NXT match in history.

Events
The events included matches that resulted from scripted storylines, where wrestlers portrayed villains, heroes, or less distinguishable characters in scripted events that built tension and culminated in a wrestling match or series of matches, with results predetermined by WWE's writers.

1999

Halftime Heat was a professional wrestling show produced by World Wrestling Federation (WWF). The event was pre-recorded and aired on January 31, 1999, the night of Super Bowl XXXIII, at the Tucson Convention Center in Tucson, Arizona.

On January 26, 1999 WWF recorded their episode of February 1 Raw. Prior to the recording the empty arena match was filmed, that aired as Halftime Heat.

2019

Halftime Heat was a professional wrestling event and WWE Network event produced by WWE for their NXT brand division. The event took place on February 3, 2019, the night of Super Bowl LIII, at the WWE Performance Center in Orlando, Florida.

After NXT TakeOver: Phoenix went off the air, Aleister Black, Ricochet, and Velveteen Dream would brawl with Adam Cole, Johnny Gargano, and Tommaso Ciampa. The brawl led to a six-man tag team match between the wrestlers was scheduled for Halftime Heat.

Other on screen personnel

References

2019 WWE Network events
Recurring events disestablished in 2000
Recurring events established in 1999
Super Bowl-related television programming
WWE NXT
WWE shows